Pak-Arab Refinery Company Limited (PARCO) is a Pakistani joint venture oil and gas company active in refining, transporting and marketing petroleum products. It is a joint-venture between governments of Pakistan and Abu Dhabi.

Business operations
PARCO, a joint venture between Government of Pakistan and the Emirate of Abu Dhabi was incorporated as a public limited company in 1974. The Government of Pakistan holds 60% of the share holding while 40% of the shares are held by Emirate of Abu Dhabi.

The   major business activities include Crude Oil Refining and Transportation, Storage and Marketing of petroleum products. With a refining capacity of 120,000 Barrels Per Day, combined storage capacity of over one million tons, a marketing joint venture with TOTAL (France) and a technical support venture with OMV (Austria); PARCO is the strategic fuel supplier for Pakistan. The organization encompasses Pakistan's second largest refinery (after Byco Petroleum Pakistan Ltd's ORC-2) and 2000 km of cross country pipeline network, including that of its subsidiary PAPCO.  In  2010, the company set up a Diesel Hydro Desulfurization Unit to ensure that Diesel produced by the refinery meets international Euro-II standards. PARCO also commissioned a Biturox plant in 2012, which is expected to produce road paving bitumen. Pak-Arab Refinery Limited is a member of Oil Companies Advisory Council of Pakistan.

In September 2012, Pak-Arab Refinery completed its first acquisition by acquiring 100% shareholding of SHV Energy Pakistan, which prior to the acquisition was Pakistan's largest LPG marketing company and PARCO's strategic partner since 2001. On 12 April 2017, the company announced that it will use technologies from Honeywell to upgrade its refinery near Multan, Pakistan to produce cleaner-burning fuels. In 2019, Pak-Arab Refinery was building its coastal refinery project near Hub, Balochistan, which would be a state of the art refinery with capacity of 250,000 barrels per day with an estimated cost of over $ 5 billion.

Business products

Total PARCO

This company has retail outlets throughout Pakistan for its products.
 Retail Fuels & Lubricants
 High Speed Diesel
 Light Speed Diesel
 Liquefied Petroleum Gas (LPG)
 Jet Fuel
 Furnace Oil
 Kerosene Oil

Board of Directors
Aftab Hussain from Sindh
Abdul Hadi Shah from Khyber Pakhtunkhwa
Bushra Naz Malik from Punjab
Syed Auon Raza Rizvi name=BR/>
Overseas

See also 

 List of oil refineries
 Pakistan Refinery Limited
 Attock Refinery Limited
 National Refinery Limited
 Byco

References

External links 
 Pak-Arab Refinery Limited
 PARCO/TOTAL website

Oil and gas companies of Pakistan
Energy companies established in 1974
Pakistan–United Arab Emirates relations
Pakistani subsidiaries of foreign companies
Government-owned companies of Pakistan
Companies based in Karachi